The Forty-Second Wisconsin Legislature convened from  to  in regular session.  They convened again in special session in February 1896 to pass a legislative redistricting law. 

Senators representing odd-numbered districts were newly elected for this session and were serving the first two years of a four-year term. Assembly members were elected to a two-year term. Assembly members and odd-numbered senators were elected in the general election of November 6, 1894. Senators representing even-numbered districts were serving the third and fourth year of a four-year term, having been elected in the general election of November 8, 1892.

Major events
 January 7, 1895: Inauguration of William H. Upham as 18th Governor of Wisconsin.
 February 25, 1895: The first rebellions of the Cuban War of Independence began.
 May 27, 1895: The United States Supreme Court, in the case In re Debs, ruled that the United States government had the authority to regulate interstate commerce.
 July 14, 1895: Wisconsin Supreme Court chief justice Harlow S. Orton died in office.  He was succeeded as chief justice by John B. Cassoday by rule of seniority.
 August 5, 1895: Roujet D. Marshall was appointed to the Wisconsin Supreme Court to fill the vacancy caused by the death of Harlow S. Orton.
 January 4, 1896: Utah was admitted as the 45th U.S. state.
 May 18, 1896: The United States Supreme Court, in the case Plessy v. Ferguson, ruled that racial segregation was legal as long as facilities were "equal", later referred to as the "separate but equal" doctrine.
 May 25, 1896: Former three-term Wisconsin Governor and Union Army general Lucius Fairchild died in Madison.
 June 6, 1896: U.S. President Grover Cleveland signed the "Filled Cheese Act", which established a prohibitive tax on cheese products that had been enhanced with vegetable oil or other fats.  This law was proposed by Wisconsin congressman Samuel A. Cook, and was part of a decades-long effort by Wisconsin's congressional delegation to prohibit selling margarine or other alternatives to dairy products.
 July 9, 1896: William Jennings Bryan delivered his famous Cross of Gold speech at the 1896 Democratic National Convention.
 August 23, 1896: The Cry of Pugad Lawin initiated the Philippine Revolution.
 November 3, 1896: 1896 United States general election: 
 William McKinley elected President of the United States.
 Edward Scofield elected Governor of Wisconsin.
 Wisconsin voters rejected a proposed constitutional amendment to allow the Legislature to set the salary of the state superintendent of public instruction.

Major legislation
 Joint Resolution agreeing to a proposed amendment to section 1, article 10, of the constitution of the state of Wisconsin, 1895 Joint Resolution 2. 
 Joint Resolution that section 7, article 7, constitution of Wisconsin, relating to circuit courts be amended so as to read as follows, 1895 Joint Resolution 8. Proposed an amendment to the state constitution to allow counties with large populations to have more than one circuit judge.
 1896 Wisc. Special Session Act 1, a legislative redistricting law based on Wisconsin's mid-decade state census.

Summary

Senate summary

Assembly summary

Sessions
 1st Regular session: January 9, 1895April 20, 1895
 February 1896 Special session: February 18, 1896February 28, 1896

Leaders

Senate leadership
 President of the Senate: Emil Baensch (R) 
 President pro tempore: Thompson Weeks (R)

Assembly leadership
 Speaker of the Assembly: George B. Burrows (R)

Members

Members of the Senate
Members of the Senate for the Forty-Second Wisconsin Legislature:

Members of the Assembly
Members of the Assembly for the Forty-Second Wisconsin Legislature:

Committees

Senate committees
 Senate Committee on AgriculturePeirce, chair
 Senate Committee on Assessment and Collection of TaxesWoodworth, chair
 Senate Committee on BankingDavis, chair
 Senate Committee on Dairy and FoodMcGillivray, chair
 Senate Committee on EducationStout, chair
 Senate Committee on Enrolled BillsPhillips, chair
 Senate Committee on Engrossed BillsConger, chair
 Senate Committee on Federal RelationsAustin, chair
 Senate Committee on IncorporationsMills, chair
 Senate Committee on the JudiciarySpensley, chair
 Senate Committee on Legislative ExpendituresMcGillivray, chair
 Senate Committee on Manufacturing and CommerceThayer, chair
 Senate Committee on Military AffairsWeeks, chair
 Senate Committee on Privileges and ElectionsStebbins, chair
 Senate Committee on Public LandsTimme, chair
 Senate Committee on RailroadsWithee, chair
 Senate Committee on Roads and BridgesYoumans, chair
 Senate Committee on State AffairsPutnam, chair
 Senate Committee on Town and County OrganizationsFisher, chair

Assembly committees
 Assembly Committee on AgricultureThomas H. Grier, chair
 Assembly Committee on Assessment and Collection of TaxesN. B. Treat, chair
 Assembly Committee on Bills on their Third ReadingCharles F. Hanke, chair
 Assembly Committee on CitiesFrank Anson, chair
 Assembly Committee on Dairy and FoodGeorge H. Blake, chair
 Assembly Committee on EducationD. O. Mahoney, chair
 Assembly Committee on Engrossed BillsJ. O. Davidson, chair
 Assembly Committee on Enrolled BillsA. H. De Groff, chair
 Assembly Committee on Federal RelationsG. J. Jeske, chair
 Assembly Committee on Forestry and HorticultureCharles Hirschinger, chair
 Assembly Committee on IncorporationsO. J. Williams, chair
 Assembly Committee on Insurance, Banks, and BankingWilliam A. Jones, chair
 Assembly Committee on the JudiciaryH. P. Burdick, chair
 Assembly Committee on Labor and ManufacturesE. R. Stillman, chair
 Assembly Committee on Legislative ExpendituresA. L. Utt, chair
 Assembly Committee on Lumber and MiningA. R. Hall, chair
 Assembly Committee on Medical SocietiesC. C. Harris, chair
 Assembly Committee on MilitiaMarshall Cousins, chair
 Assembly Committee on Privileges and ElectionsH. C. Sloan, chair
 Assembly Committee on Public ImprovementsJ. B. Miller, chair
 Assembly Committee on Public LandsC. A. Stanley, chair
 Assembly Committee on RailroadsE. D. Hoyt, chair
 Assembly Committee on Roads and BridgesL. B. Cox, chair
 Assembly Committee on State AffairsJ. G. Lamberson, chair
 Assembly Committee on Town and County OrganizationWilliam O'Neil, chair
 Assembly Committee on Ways and MeansJames Freeman, chair

Joint committees
 Joint Committee on Charitable and Penal InstitutionsOfficer (Sen.) & Fenner Kimball (Asm.), co-chairs
 Joint Committee on ClaimsBaxter(Sen.) & Frank L. Fraser (Asm.), co-chairs
 Joint Committee on Fish and GameTimme (Sen.) & Henry L. Besse (Asm.), co-chairs
 Joint Committee on PrintingPeirce (Sen.) & James T. Ellarson (Asm.), co-chairs

Employees

Senate employees
 Chief Clerk: Walter Houser
 Assistant Chief Clerk: Fred W. Coon
 Journal Clerk: William M. Fogo
 Bookkeeper: E. S. Hotchkiss
 Assistant Bookkepper: I. S. Griffin
 Engrossing Clerk: Francis Stirn
 Assistant Engrossing Clerk: Helena Heyd
 Enrolling Clerk: L. J. Burlingame
 Assistant Enrolling Clerk: George L. Kingsley Jr.
 Proofreader: H. F. Poland
 Index Clerk: F. L. Perrin
 Assistant Index Clerk: Charles Jewell
 Copy Holder: E. A. Charlton
 Clerk for the Judiciary Committee: C. S. Spensley
 Clerk for the Committee on Incorporations: M. P. Schmitt
 Clerk for the Committee on Claims: James M. Hayden
 Clerk for the Committee on Town and County Organization: Fisher
 Clerk for the Committee on Railroads: W. E. Miner
 Clerk for the Committee on State Affairs: Fred Gilman
 Clerk for the Committee on Engrossed Bills: S. A. Pelton
 Clerk for the Committee on Enrolled Bills: Hattie M. Phillips
 Document Clerk: Arton T. Sutton
 Comparing Clerks:
 Caroline Lawson
 S. N. Hartwell
 C. L. Fellows
 Edwin French
 General Clerks:
 C. P. Northrup
 LeRoy Thomas
 Horace G. Cole
 A. W. James
 Ruling Clerk: Eddie Sherman
 Printing Page: B. Staunchfield
 Sergeant-at-Arms: Charles A. Pettibone
 Assistant Sergeant-at-Arms: Hans J. Jacobson
 Postmaster: Harvey R. Rawson
 Assistant Postmaster: Charles W. Stewart
 Gallery Attendants: Henry Grapengleser
 General Attendants: 
 Iver Torkelson
 George S. Sutherland
 Document Room Attendant: Thomas R. McLean
 Doorkeepers:
 Robert McCalvy
 Daniel E. Catlin
 John Keller
 Charles D. Nelson
 Night Watch: George J. Walters
 Custodian: Edwin Culver
 Night Laborer: William Gillett
 Messengers:
 Hugh W. Whitcomb
 James E. Calmso
 Walter E. Grams
 James S. Bartels
 Arthur Schempp
 Alfred Johnson
 Anton Kempter
 Eldon D. Woodworth
 Jacob G. Childs

Assembly employees
 Chief Clerk: N. A. Nowell
 Assistant Chief Clerk: Oliver G. Munson
 Journal Clerks:
 Charles M. Durkee
 B. H. Sanford
 Bookkeepers: 
 C. E. Brightman
 Robert A. Gillett
 Engrossing Clerk: Julius Ewald
 Enrolling Clerk: John W. Hare
 Index Clerk: C. K. Pettingill
 Stationary Clerk: Frank S. Horner
 Proof Reader: John H. Frazier
 Printing Clerk: Samuel J. Williams
 Clerk for the Judiciary Committee: W. C. Reilly
 Stenographer for the Judiciary Committee: Ella K. Smith
 Clerk for the Committee on Enrolled Bills: Andrew Rohrscheib
 Clerk for the Committee on Engrossed Bills: Joseph Smethurst
 Clerk for the Committee on Assessment and Collection of Taxes: Harvey Clark
 Clerk for the Committee on State Affairs: W. C. Thomas
 Clerk for the Committee on Railroads: Dan B. Starkey
 Clerk for the Committee on Insurance, Banks, and Banking: Ole Steensland
 Clerk for the Committee on Town and County Organization: Jery Palmer
 Clerk for the Committee on Bills on Third Reading: N. Marte
 Document Clerk: K. W. Jensen
 Sergeant-at-Arms: Benjamin Franklin Millard
 Assistant Sergeant-at-Arms: Joseph B. Johnson
 Postmaster: O. B. Moon
 Assistant Postmaster: C. H. Underhill
 Doorkeepers:
 Edward Emerson
 Daniel Stromstad
 R. J. Jeskie
 William Disch
 Document Room Attendant: A. C. Lymon
 Gallery Attendants:
 Edwin Davis
 John Campbell
 Day Attendant: T. F. Monty
 Committee Room Attendants: 
 F. G. Dahlberg
 Max Booth
 Wallace Hegelmire
 Henry Kessler
 S. H. Sorinson
 M. Nelson
 Porter: Aretus Bond
 Flagman: Harvey Allen
 Night Watch: I. O. Hilmoe
 Custodian of the Enrolling Room: Albert Glander
 Custodian of the Engrossing Room: R. A. Vedder
 Committee Room Custodians:
 C. E. Foot
 S. Teasdeal
 Wash Room Attendants: 
 Louis Donald
 Herman Miller
 Coat Room Attendants: 
 Frank Gaus
 Sam Debrozzo
 Janitor: Jacob Dischler
 Pages:
 Frank Howard
 Paul Sumers
 Claude Blake
 Alford Wilkey
 William Hoskosh
 Eddie Beebie
 Arthur Nichols
 Clyde Varley
 George Cary
 John Millard
 Kurt Pressentin
 George Thompson

References

External links
 1895: Related Documents from Wisconsin Legislature

1895 in Wisconsin
1896 in Wisconsin
Wisconsin
Wisconsin
Wisconsin legislative sessions